is one of the first successful female Japanese shōjo manga artists. She was an assistant of Osamu Tezuka staying in Tokiwa-sō. She made her professional debut in 1955 with Akakke Kōma Pony, a Western story with a tomboy heroine. She became a prominent shōjo artist in the 1960s and 1970s, starting with White Troika, which serialized in Margaret in 1963.

Mizuno is best known for Fire! (1969–1971), one of the first shōjo manga with a boy protagonist, for which she won the 1970 Shogakukan Manga Award. Her Honey Honey no Suteki na Bouken (1966) was adapted as an anime television series, licensed in English as Honey Honey on CBN Cable Network.

Early life
Hideko Mizuno discovered manga very early: at the age of 8 she read the manga Shin Takarajima by Osamu Tezuka as well as his book Manga Daigaku which teaches the basics of manga creation, thanks to these two books, she took Tezuka as a model and decided to become a mangaka. In 1952 at the age of 12, she regularly contributed to competitions organized by the monthly magazine Manga Shōnen chaired by Tezuka. Although her manga was never accepted, her efforts did not go unnoticed: she received an honorable mention and publisher Akira Maruyama from Kōdansha took notice.  In March 1955 when she was about to leave junior high for work, not wishing to go to high school, she received a letter from Maruyama, an order for a board and two illustrations for the magazine Shōjo Club, Hideko Mizuno was then 15 years old.

Biography
For a year and a half, Mizuno worked to make a living and drew for Shōjo Club at the same time. Her first manga published in 1955, Akkake kōma pony is like the rest of the mangaka's career: the story was about a "little girl and a pony" and while her publisher Mazuyama was expecting a sentimental manga with a sensitive and fragile heroine who was the norm in the magazine's productions, Mizuno provided a Western- inspired manga with a tomboy heroine, and although the manga did not match what was requested, it was nevertheless published.

In 1956 Mizuno went to Tokyo for the first time where she met Tezuka, she then decided to become a full-time mangaka. The following year she published her first series, Gin no hanabira , which was a success. In 1958, invited by Tezuka, she moved to Tokyo in the Tokiwa-sō apartment where she lived and worked with the two authors Shōtarō Ishinomori and Fujio Akatsuka, together they collaborated on two manga under the pseudonym U. Mia for the magazine Shōjo Club. She only stayed in Tokiwa-sō for a year.

Continuing her career as a mangaka, Mizuno's work met with success and helped broaden the register of shōjo manga: until the mid-1960s, shōjo manga regularly followed the structure of haha-mono, centered on the mother-daughter relationship.  During the 1960s several women mangaka, including Mizuno, introduced a new type of story: the romantic comedy.  Mizuno notably adapted two films in manga form, with Sabrina adapted in the manga Sutekina cora (1963) and The Quiet Man adapted as Akage no scarlet(1966).

Mizuno created Harp of the Stars in 1960, a love story drawing from Norse mythology.

Mizuno is best known for Fire! (1969–1971), one of the first shōjo manga with a boy protagonist, for which she won the 1970 Shogakukan Manga Award. Mizuno was a fan of progressive rock such as Pink Floyd. After the serialisation of Fire!, Mizuno became a single mother.

Her Honey Honey no Suteki na Bouken (1966) was adapted as an anime television series, licensed in English as Honey Honey on CBN Cable Network.

Some of Mizuno's works star adult women as protagonists, distinguished from children by the work's inclusion of heterosexual love.  Mizuno was inspired by Hollywood romantic films like those featuring Audrey Hepburn.

Works
 Konnichiwa sensei = Harō doku, 1968
 Gin no hanabira, 1969
 Faiyā : Fire, 1972
 Budda to onna no monogatari, 1986
 Erizabēto, 1996

References

Bibliography

Further reading

External links 
 Profile  at The Ultimate Manga Guide
 Official website

1939 births
Living people
Women manga artists
Manga artists from Yamaguchi Prefecture
Japanese female comics artists
Female comics writers
People from Shimonoseki
Japanese women writers
Japanese writers